The Fourth World War is a 2003 documentary film directed by Richard Rowley.  Its subject is various current or recent resistance movements in different parts of the world.

References

External links

2003 films
American documentary films
2003 documentary films
Documentary films about war
2000s English-language films
2000s American films